Karoli may refer to:

Karoli (name)

Places
Karoli, Estonia, a village
Karoli, Rewari, India, a village
Karauli (formerly known as Karoli), India, a city

See also

Karola
Karolin (name)
Karolj